This is a list of finalists for the 2022 Archibald Prize for portraiture (listed is Artist – Title). Of the 816 entries received for the Archibald Prize, 52 artworks were selected as finalists. A record 20 Aboriginal Australian artists entered the prize in 2022. As the images are copyrighted, a link to each image is available through its reference.

 Mostafa Azimitabar – KNS088 (self-portrait)
 Natasha Bieniek – Patricia Piccinini
 Daniel Boyd – Untitled (AAO)
 Joanna Braithwaite – McManusstan
 Keith Burt – Bridie Gillman
 Ann Cape – Walking a tightrope
 Yvette Coppersmith – Ella Simons seated
 Emily Crockford – The pattern in the mountains of Studio A, best friends Emma and Gabrielle
 Jonathan Dalton – Day 77
 Anh Do – Peter, up close
 Blak Douglas – Moby Dickens (Karla Dickens) (Winner: Archibald Prize 2022)
 Yvonne East – Knee-deep (portrait of Lisa McCune)
 Jeremy Eden – Samuel Johnson OAM
 David Fenoglio – Yuriyal, Eric
 Hong Fu – Portrait of Peter Wegner
 Eliza Gosse – somewhere near home
 Robert Hannaford – Hirsute self-portrait
 Tsering Hannaford – Sally Scales
 Katherine Hattam – Helen Garner speaks French
 HEGO – OA
 Yoshio Honjo – Yumi Stynes as onna-musha (female samurai)
 Ksenija Hrnjak – Red gloves of Tim Tszyu
 Laura Jones – Brooke and Jimmy
 Solomon Kammer – The (disabled artist) hustle
 Jasper Knight – Abdul Abdullah
 Kim Leutwyler – Courtney and Shane
 Richard Lewer – Liz Laverty
 Dapeng Liu – John and the light of ultramarine (John Yu)
 Kathrin Longhurst – Irrational
 Fiona Lowry – Glenn Murcutt
 Mathew Lynn – Yaka moto, Magic Pierre
 Catherine McGuiness – Rosary with the seagull
 Noel McKenna – Patrick Corrigan OA, with Rosie
 Robert Malherbe – Dana, head in hands
 Lewis Miller – Deborah Conway
 Vincent Namatjira – Self-portrait with dingo
 Paul Newton – Portrait of Hugh Jackman and Deborra-Lee Furness
 Meagan Pelham – Romance is LOVE
 James Powditch – Laura Tingle – the fourth estate
 Jude Rae – The big switch – portrait of Dr Saul Griffith
 Jordan Richardson – Venus
 Thom Roberts – Rachey in the mirror
 Joan Ross – 'You were my biggest regret': diary entry 1806
 Wendy Sharpe – Self-portrait with ghosts
 Claus Stangl – Taika Waititi (Winner: Packing Room Prize 2022)
 Nick Stathopoulos – The red scarf: portrait of Wayne Tunnicliffe
 Ross Townsend – Staying strong
 Avraham Vofsi – John Safran as David and Goliath
 Felix von Dallwitz – Dylan Alcott, AOTY
 Natasha Walsh – Dear Brett (the blue room)
 Michael Zavros – At the British Museum
 Caroline Zilinsky – Kubla Khan

References 

Archibald Prize finalists
2022 awards in Australia
2022-related lists
Lists of artists
Lists of works of art
2022 art awards